Vendela Vida (born September 6, 1971) is an American novelist, journalist, editor, screenplay writer, and educator. She is the author of multiple books, has worked as a writing teacher, and is a founder and editor of The Believer magazine.

Early life
Vida was born on the 6 September 1971 in San Francisco, California. Both of her parents were European immigrants, her mother was from Sweden and her father is Hungarian. She inherited the name Vendela from her maternal grandmother.

She left California to get her bachelor's degree in English in 1993 at Middlebury College in Vermont, and it was through a mutual friend from her undergraduate degree that she met her future spouse, Dave Eggers. She later continued her studies and received a Master of Fine Arts degree at Columbia University. After graduating, she interned at the Paris Review, and she adapted her master's degree thesis into her first book, Girls on the Verge.

Career 
In 2003, Vida co-founded The Believer magazine with Dave Eggers and works as an editor with her friends from grad school Heidi Julavits and Ed Park. The Believer happens to be located next door to McSweeney's.

She is a co-founder and board member of 826 Valencia, a nonprofit organization that teaches creative writing to children and teens.

Vida collaborated with Dave Eggers on the screenplay for the 2009 film Away We Go, directed by Sam Mendes and co-starring John Krasinski and Maya Rudolph.

In 2017, Vida was a Lurie Author-in-Residence and instructor in the Department of English and Comparative Literature at San Jose State University.

Books
Published in 2003, And Now You Can Go is a novel set in New York City, San Francisco, and the Philippines, tracing the impulsive journeys of a young woman in the wake of an assault. In a 2003 Guardian article Vida voiced her plan to author a trilogy of novels "on the subject of violence and rage."

The second novel, Let the Northern Lights Erase Your Name (2007, HarperCollins), is a thriller that takes place in the Sápmi region. As a 2013 fellow at the Sundance Labs, Vida alongside Eva Weber developed Let the Northern Lights Erase Your Name into a script, which received the Sundance Institute Mahindra Global Filmmaking Award.

The Lovers (June 2010, Ecco), author Joyce Carol Oates called it "a riveting and suspenseful novel about an American woman’s voyage to self-discovery.” The Diver's Clothes Lie Empty (2015, Ecco/HarperCollins), was inspired by a trip Vida took to Morocco where her bag was stolen.

Two of Vida’s novels have been New York Times notable books of the year, and she is the winner of the 2007 Kate Chopin Award, given to a writer whose female protagonist chooses an unconventional path.

Personal life
She is married to author Dave Eggers, has two children, and lives in the San Francisco Bay Area. Vida and Eggers had met in 1998 in San Francisco at a wedding and started dating in 1999.

Works

References

External links
The San Francisco Chronicle on Vendela Vida
Vida interview in Identity Theory

1971 births
Living people
American women novelists
Columbia University School of the Arts alumni
Writers from San Francisco
Middlebury College alumni
21st-century American women writers
21st-century American novelists
American people of Swedish descent
Novelists from California
San Jose State University faculty